Tanggu may refer to:

Tanggu District, district of Tianjin, China
Port of Tianjin, formerly Port of Tanggu
Tanggu Truce, signed in the Tanggu District
Tanggu (drum), a type of Chinese drum
Tanggu Pass